This is a List of World Championships medalists in men's Greco-Roman Wrestling.

Light flyweight
 48 kg: 1969–1995

Flyweight
 52 kg: 1950–1995
 54 kg: 1997–2001
 55 kg: 2018–

Bantamweight
 58 kg: 1921–1922
 57 kg: 1950–1995
 58 kg: 1997–2001
 55 kg: 2002–2013
 59 kg: 2014–2017
 60 kg: 2018–

Featherweight
 60 kg: 1911–1920
 62 kg: 1921–1961
 63 kg: 1962–1967
 62 kg: 1969–1995
 63 kg: 1997–2001
 60 kg: 2002–2013
 63 kg: 2018–

Lightweight
 68 kg: 1905
 75 kg: 1907
 60 kg: 1910
 67 kg: 1911
 67.5 kg: 1913–1922
 67 kg: 1950–1961
 70 kg: 1962–1967
 68 kg: 1969–1995
 69 kg: 1997–2001
 66 kg: 2002–2017
 67 kg: 2018–

Light welterweight
 71 kg: 2014–2017
 72 kg: 2018–

Welterweight
 73 kg: 1950–1961
 78 kg: 1962–1967
 74 kg: 1969–1995
 76 kg: 1997–2001
 74 kg: 2002–2013
 75 kg: 2014–2017
 77 kg: 2018–

Light middleweight
 80 kg: 2014–2017
 82 kg: 2018–

Middleweight
 75 kg: 1904
 80 kg: 1905
 85 kg: 1907
 75 kg: 1908–1909
 70 kg: 1910
 73 kg: 1911
 75 kg: 1913–1922
 79 kg: 1950–1961
 87 kg: 1962–1967
 82 kg: 1969–1995
 85 kg: 1997–2001
 84 kg: 2002–2013
 85 kg: 2014–2017
 87 kg: 2018–

Light heavyweight
 85 kg: 1910
 83 kg: 1911
 82.5 kg: 1913–1922
 87 kg: 1950–1961
 97 kg: 1962–1967
 90 kg: 1969–1995

Heavyweight
 +75 kg: 1904
 +80 kg: 1905
 +85 kg: 1907
 +75 kg: 1908–1909
 +85 kg: 1910
 +83 kg: 1911
 +82.5 kg: 1913–1922
 +87 kg: 1950–1961
 +97 kg: 1962–1967
 100 kg: 1969–1995
 97 kg: 1997–2001
 96 kg: 2002–2013
 98 kg: 2014–2017
 97 kg: 2018–

Super heavyweight
 +100 kg: 1969–1983
 130 kg: 1985–2001
 120 kg: 2002–2013
 130 kg: 2014–

Medal table

 Names in italic are national entities that no longer exist.

References
UWW Database
info.2008.sohu.com

Medalists
Wrestling World Championships